John Winstanley (1678? – 1750) was an English Enlightenment figure and poet, probably born in Ireland.

Works 
Poems Written Occasionally (1742)

References

Notes

Related Links
 John Winstanley at the Eighteenth-Century Poetry Archive (ECPA)

1670s births
1750 deaths
English male poets